The Development Bureau (DEVB) is an agency of the Government of Hong Kong responsible for urban planning and renewal, land administration, infrastructure development, building safety, landscape, greening & tree development, water supplies, flood prevention and heritage conservation.

The Bureau is supervised by the Secretary for Development.

History 
The Development Bureau of Hong Kong was created on 1 July 2007 as part of a governmental reorganisation introduced under Donald Tsang.

Responsibility for urban planning, environmental protection, and lands administration originally fell under the Planning, Environment and Lands Bureau when the Hong Kong SAR government was established in 1997.

Beginning 1 January 2000, the responsibility for environmental protection was transferred to the Environment and Food Bureau; the Planning, Environment and Lands Bureau was renamed Planning and Lands Bureau.

When the Principal Officials Accountability System went into effect on 1 July 2002, the Housing Bureau and Planning and Lands Bureau were combined into the Housing, Planning and Lands Bureau.

In 2007, the Development Bureau was established and took over the responsibility of planning and lands administration from the Housing, Planning and Lands Bureau, public works from the Environment, Transportation and Works Bureau, and heritage conservation from Home Affairs Bureau.

Structure
The Bureau comprises six divisions under two branches overseen by respective Permanent Secretaries:

Planning and Lands Branch
The Planning and Lands Branch oversees the urban planning and redevelopment in Hong Kong. Its responsibilities include ensuring a sufficient land supply and optimising land use, implementing urban renewal plans and maintaining a land administration system. The divisions under the Planning and Lands Branch are:
Lands Division
Planning Division
Urban Renewal and Buildings Division

Works Branch
The Works Branch of the Bureau focuses on the management and implementation of infrastructure, as well as heritage conservation and maintenance in Hong Kong. The divisions under the Works Branch are:
Heritage, Programme and Resource Division
Works Policies and Infrastructure Projects Divisions
Legal Advisory Division (Works)
Energizing Kowloon East Office (EKEO)

Subordinate agencies 
The following public agencies are managed by the bureau:
 Buildings Department
 Lands Department
 Lands Registry
 Planning Department
 Architectural Services Department
 Civil Engineering and Development Department
 Drainage Services Department
 Electrical and Mechanical Services Department
 Water Supplies Department

Energising Kowloon East Office (EKEO) 
The plans to redevelop Kowloon East, an industrial area that spans along the Victoria Harbour between Kwun Tong, Kowloon Bay and former Kai Tak Airport, was first announced in a policy address on 12 October 2011. The redevelopment plan would transform Kowloon East into a second central business district in addition to Central. In June 2012, the Development Bureau founded the Energising Kowloon East Office as an entity under the Works Branch to steer and oversee the development of this area.

See also
Urban Renewal Authority
Town Planning Board
Construction Industry Council
Harbourfront Commission
City Gallery (Hong Kong)
Public Works Department (Hong Kong)

References

External links
 

Hong Kong government policy bureaux
Hong Kong
Hong Kong
2007 establishments in Hong Kong